The Three-year Expedition was an exploratory expedition to East Greenland that lasted from 1931 to 1934 financed by the Carlsberg Foundation and the Danish state. The expedition included aerial surveys.

Many geographic features in East Greenland were mapped and named during the expedition. Eskimonaes station was used as a wintering base by the Three-year Expedition to East Greenland.

History 
The expedition was led by Lauge Koch. The other participants were Danish and Swedish geographers, geologists, archaeologists, zoologists and botanists: Paul Gelting, Gunnar Seidenfaden, Thorvald Sørensen, Steen Hasselbach, Helge G. Backlund, Gunnar Thorson, Gunnar Säve-Söderbergh, Helge Larsen, Thyge Johansen, L. Bruhn, H. Heinrich Nielsen and N. V. Petersen. The expedition vessels were Godthaab and Gustav Holm. The engagement of the Danish state had political connotations, because of the ongoing dispute between Denmark and Norway over East Greenland.

See also 
 Arctic exploration
 List of Arctic expeditions
 Cartographic expeditions to Greenland
 King Frederick VIII Land
 Cape Brown (Greenland)

Bibliography 
 Thorson, G., ed. (1937) Med treaarsekspeditionen til Christian X's land. Af deltagere i ekspeditionen. København, Gyldendalske Boghandel Nordisk Forlag.
 Seidenfaden, G. (1938) Moderne Arktisk Forskning, Copenhagen. English edition 1939, Modern Arctic Exploration, with a preface by Peter Freuchen, translated by Naomi Walford.

References 

Exploration of the Arctic
Arctic expeditions
1931 in Greenland 
1932 in Greenland 
1933 in Greenland 
1934 in Greenland 
20th century in Greenland
Expeditions from Denmark
Expeditions from Sweden
20th century in the Arctic
20th century in the Danish colonial empire